Institute for the Study of the Jewish Question was a German institute under Goebbels founded in 1934.

Institute for the Study of the Jewish Question may also refer to:
 Institute for Research on the Jewish Question,, a Nazi antisemitic political organization founded in Frankfurt in 1939 under Alfred Rosenberg
 Institute for the Study of Jewish Questions, an antisemitic organization established in France under Nazi rule

See also 
 Institute for the Study and Elimination of Jewish Influence on German Church Life